, born , was a Japanese film and television actor. He appeared in more than 100 films from 1954 to 2005.

Career
Born in Tokyo, Fujiki graduated from Doshisha University and joined the Toho studio in 1954. He began by playing straight male leads, but later shifted to more comical roles, especially in combination with Tadao Takashima. He left the studio in 1974 and found success on television in such series as G-Men '75.

Filmography

Film

Television

References

External links
 

1931 births
2005 deaths
People from Tokyo
Japanese male film actors
Doshisha University alumni
Japanese male television actors